Michael McCoy is an American industrial designer and educator .

Michael or Mike McCoy may also refer to:

Sports

American football
 Mike McCoy (American football coach) (born 1972), American football coach
 Mike McCoy (cornerback) (1953–2016), American football defensive back
 Mike McCoy (defensive tackle) (born 1948), former American football defensive lineman

Other sports
 Mike McCoy (baseball) (born 1981), American baseball player
 Mike McCoy (golfer) (born 1962), American golfer

Others
 Mike McCoy (businessman), oil and gas businessman
 Mike McCoy (motorcyclist), stunt rider and competitor in the Baja 1000
 Mike McCoy, member of The Brothers Four
 Mike McCoy (filmmaker) (born 1969), American film director
 Michael N.W. McCoy, United States Air Force colonel, after whom McCoy Air Force Base was named